Marshall Terrace is a neighborhood in the Northeast community in Minneapolis, Minnesota.

Location and characteristics
Marshall Terrace's boundaries are Saint Anthony Parkway to the north, 4th Street and University Avenue to the east, Lowry Avenue to the south, and the Mississippi River to the west. It is named for former Minnesota governor William Rainey Marshall.

Much of Marshall Terrace is reserved for industrial use with utilities and industries situated along the western border and railroad tracks along the east. Its housing was developed in the early 20th century to provide homes for those working in nearby industries and is concentrated in the central part of the neighborhood. The housing stock consists largely of smaller single family homes.

Landmarks
Marshall Terrace has two parks located along the Mississippi River: Marshall Terrace Park and Marshall Terrace Gardens. The Grand Rounds Scenic Byway also runs along St. Anthony Parkway on the neighborhood's northern border.

Transportation
The neighborhood is served by Metro Transit bus routes 11 (2nd Street NE/Grand Street NE) and 32 (Lowry Avenue). St. Anthony Parkway and part of University Avenue have separated bike paths.

References

External links

Neighborhoods in Minneapolis
Minnesota populated places on the Mississippi River